Tangcun is a town in Xincai County, Zhumadian Prefecture, Henan Province, China.

References

Township-level divisions of Henan
Zhumadian